Brigadier-General Henry Clifford Rodes Green,  (15 May 1872 – 15 April 1935) was a senior British Army officer during the First World War.

Green was the son of Sir William Green of the British Indian Army and Louisa Dunn, daughter of John Henry Dunn. He was commissioned as a second lieutenant into the King's Royal Rifle Corps on 18 November 1891, having attended the Royal Military College, Sandhurst, and was promoted to lieutenant on 3 January 1895. He served in the Second Boer War 1899-1902, as adjutant of the 2nd battalion from 23 October 1899, and was present at the actions of Rietfontein and Lombard´s Kop, the defence of Ladysmith and actions at Laing's Nek. While in South Africa he was promoted to captain on 7 January 1900. After peace was declared in May 1902, Green left South Africa on board the SS Bavarian and arrived in the United Kingdom the following month.

In 1915 he took command of the newly raised 8th Battalion of the regiment, part of the 41st Brigade. From 7 August 1916, he was Brigade Commander of the 20th Brigade which was engaged on the Western Front. Green was wounded on 5 October 1917 during the Third Battle of Ypres. He subsequently commanded the brigade on the Italian Front until the end of the war.

Green was awarded the Distinguished Service Order in June 1916.
In September 1917 he was made a Commander of the Belgian Order of the Crown. He was made a Companion of the Order of St Michael and St George in January 1918. On 2 March 1923 he was decorated by the Italian government as a Commander of the Order of Saints Maurice and Lazarus. He retired in 1923.

He married Florence Elmslie Humphrey Davidson in 1910, with whom he had two children.

References

1872 births
1935 deaths
Military personnel from London
British Army brigadiers
King's Royal Rifle Corps officers
British Army generals of World War I
Companions of the Order of the Bath
Graduates of the Royal Military College, Sandhurst
British Army personnel of the Second Boer War
Companions of the Order of St Michael and St George
Companions of the Distinguished Service Order
Recipients of the Croix de Guerre 1914–1918 (France)